Foëcy is a commune in the Cher department in the Centre-Val de Loire region of France.

Geography
The disused Canal de Berry, the A71 and the TER railway all pass through the territory of the commune.

Population

Sights

 A war memorial.
 The tomb of Louis Lourioux (French link)
 The church of St. Denis, dating from the nineteenth century.
 The eighteenth-century chateau, with parts from a feudal castle.
 A museum of porcelain.

See also
Communes of the Cher department

References

Communes of Cher (department)